F. Charles Brunicardi (born May 10, 1954) is an American physician.

On July 1, 2011, Brunicardi rejoined the UCLA faculty as Moss Foundation Professor of Gastrointestinal and Personalized Surgery and Chief of General Surgery at the UCLA Santa Monica Medical Center and a Vice Chairman of the Department of Surgery at the David Geffen School of Medicine at UCLA.  He is currently the Senior Vice President and Dean of the College of Medicine at SUNY Downstate Health Sciences University.

Early life and education

Brunicardi was born in Perth Amboy, New Jersey, on May 10, 1954. He attended Johns Hopkins University, graduating Phi Beta Kappa in 1976. He graduated from Rutgers University School of Medicine in Piscataway, New Jersey. Upon graduation from Rutgers Medical School in 1980, Brunicardi served as a research assistant in the Department of Anesthesiology at Cornell University Medical Center in New York, New York. Brunicardi interned in surgery at Mount Zion Hospital in San Francisco, California and was a surgical resident at SUNY Downstate Medical Center in Brooklyn, New York from 1982-1983. From 1983-1986 he was a fellow in research in the Department of Surgery at SUNY Health Science Center and won several national and international research awards. From 1986-1988 he was a Senior Resident in Surgery at SUNY, and from 1988-1989 he was the Chief Resident of General Surgery at SUNY Health Science Center.

Career
Brunicardi, a gastrointestinal surgeon-scientist,  was a member of the UCLA surgical faculty from 1989 to 1995, when he was recruited to Baylor College of Medicine in Houston, Texas as George Jordan Professor and Chief of General Surgery.  In 1999, Brunicardi became DeBakey/Bard Professor and Chairman of the Michael E. DeBakey Department of Surgery at Baylor and held that position for 12 years before returning to UCLA. In December 2019, Brunicardi was named as Senior Vice President and Dean of the College of Medicine at SUNY Downstate Health Sciences University.

Research interests and contributions

Brunicardi's research interests focus upon translational genomic medicine and surgery. His clinical areas of expertise include gastrointestinal surgery and surgery of neuroendocrine tumors.  Brunicardi has held continuous research funding since 1992, and he has a vast bibliography with more than 270 publications and is the editor of a surgical textbook.

References

External links
  AccessSurgery

1954 births
Living people
American surgeons
People from Perth Amboy, New Jersey
Johns Hopkins University alumni
University of Medicine and Dentistry of New Jersey alumni
Cornell University staff
State University of New York people
Baylor College of Medicine physicians and researchers
Rutgers University alumni